The Syrphini are a tribe of hoverflies.

List of genera 
Relationships within this tribe were investigated by analysing and comparing genetic data. Results seem to show the members of Syrphini fall into several smaller groups or clades.

Afrosyrphus Curran, 1927
Agnisyrphus Ghorpade, 1994
Allobacha Curran, 1928
Allograpta Osten Sacken, 1875. Subgenera: A. (Allograpta), A. (Antillus), A. (Claraplumula), A. (Costarica), A. (Fazia), A. (Rhinoprosopa)
Anu Thompson, 2008
Asarkina Macquart, 1834. Subgenera: A. (Achoanus), A. (Asarkina)
Asiodidea Stackelberg, 1930
Betasyrphus Matsumura, 1917
Chrysotoxum Meigen, 1803
Citrogramma Vockeroth, 1969
Dasysyrphus Enderlein, 1938
Didea Macquart, 1834
Dideomima Vockeroth, 1969
Dideoides Brunetti, 1908
Dideopsis Matsumura, 1917
Doros Meigen, 1803
Eosphaerophoria Frey, 1946
Epistrophe Walker, 1852
Epistrophella Dusek & Laska, 1967
Episyrphus Matsumura & Adachi, 1917. Subgenera: E. (Asiobaccha), E. (Episyrphus)
Eriozona Schiner, 1860
Eupeodes Osten Sacken, 1877. Subgenera: E. (Eupeodes), E. (Macrosyrphus), E. (Metasyrphus)
Fagisyrphus Dusek & Laska, 1967
Fazia Shannon, 1927
Giluwea Vockeroth, 1969
Ischiodon Sack, 1913
Lamellidorsum Huo & Zheng, 2005
Lapposyrphus Dusek & Laska, 1967
Leucozona Schiner, 1860. Subgenera: L. (Ischyrosyrphus), L. (Leucozona)
Megasyrphus Dusek & Laska, 1967
Melangyna Verrall, 1901. Subgenera: M. (Austrosyrphus), M. (Melangyna), M. (Melanosyrphus)
Meligramma Frey, 1946
Meliscaeva Frey, 1946
Notosyrphus Vockeroth, 1969
Ocyptamus Macquart, 1834. Subgenera: O. (Ocyptamus), O. (Mimocalla), O. (Pipunculosyrphus)
Paragus Latreille, 1804
Parasyrphus Matsumura, 1917
Philhelius Stephens, 1841 (= Xanthogramma)
Pelloloma Vockeroth, 1973
Pseudodoros Becker, 1903
Rhinobaccha Meijere, 1908
Salpingogaster Schiner, 1868. Subgenera: S. (Eosalpingogaster), S. (Salpingogaster)
Scaeva Fabricius, 1805
Simosyrphus Bigot, 1882
Sphaerophoria Le Peletier & Serville, 1828. Subgenera: Subgenera: S. (Exallandra), S. (Loveridgeana), S. (Sphaerophoria)
Syrphus Fabricius, 1775
Toxomerus Macquart, 1855
Victoriana Miranda, 2020
Vockerothiella Ghorpade, 1994

References 

 
Brachycera tribes